Juglandoideae is a subfamily of the walnut family Juglandaceae.

This clade was first described by Koidzumi in 1937 by the name "Drupoideae," based on the drupe-like fruits of Juglans and Carya. This name was rejected because it was not based on the name of the type genus. Leroy (1955) and Melchior (1964) both published descriptions of the clade using the name "Jugandoideae," but both were deemed invalid due to technicalities. The first valid publication of the name was by Manning (1978).
 Subfamily Juglandoideae 
 Tribe Caryeae 
 Carya  – hickory and pecan
 Annamocarya 
 Platycarya 
 Tribe Juglandeae 
 Cyclocarya  – wheel wingnut
 Juglans  – walnut
 Pterocarya  – wingnut

Manos and Stone (2001) proposed the following reorganization to reflect a more probable phylogenetic relationship that shows that Platycarya is sister to the rest of the subfamily, while Manchester (1987) addressed the fossil record of the subfamily:

Subfamily Juglandoideae 
 Tribe Platycaryeae 
 †Hooleya 
 †Palaeoplatycarya 
 Platycarya 
 †Platycarypollenites 
 †Pterocaryopsis 
 †Vinea 
 Tribe Juglandeae 
 Subtribe Caryinae 
 Annamocarya 
 Carya  – hickory and pecan
 †Caryapollenites 
 †Eucaryoxylon 
 †Juglandicarya 
 Subtribe Juglandinae 
 Cyclocarya  – wheel wingnut
 Juglans  – walnut
 Pterocarya  – wingnut
 †Pterocaryoxylon 
 Tribe Incertae sedis
 †Boreocarya 
 †Cruciptera 
 †Globocarya 
 †Polyptera

References

 
Rosid subfamilies